The 2009 IPP Open was a professional tennis tournament played on indoor carpet courts. It was the ninth edition of the tournament which was part of the 2009 ATP Challenger Tour. It took place in Helsinki, Finland between 23 and 29 November 2009.

ATP entrants

Seeds

 Rankings are as of November 16, 2009.

Other entrants
The following players received wildcards into the singles main draw:
  Evgeny Donskoy
  Antony Dupuis
  Henri Kontinen
  Henri Laaksonen

The following players received entry from the qualifying draw:
  Ilya Belyaev
  Robin Haase
  Michał Przysiężny
  Aisam-ul-Haq Qureshi

Champions

Singles

 Michał Przysiężny def.  Stéphane Bohli, 4–6, 6–4, 6–1

Doubles

 Rohan Bopanna /  Aisam-ul-Haq Qureshi def.  Henri Kontinen /  Jarkko Nieminen, 6–2, 7–6(7)

External links
Official website
ITF search 
2009 Draws

IPP Open
IPP Open